Luis Miguel Cámara Díaz (born November 28, 1993) is a Mexican professional footballer who plays for Atlante of Ascenso MX.

External links

References

1993 births
Living people
Mexican footballers
Atlante F.C. footballers
Liga MX players

Association footballers not categorized by position
Place of birth missing (living people)
21st-century Mexican people